Matheus Oliveira de Souza (born 6 September 1996), commonly known as Matheus Oliveira, is a Brazilian footballer who currently plays as a defender for Grêmio Anápolis.

Career statistics

Club

Notes

References

1996 births
Living people
Brazilian footballers
Brazil youth international footballers
Association football defenders
Campeonato Brasileiro Série C players
Sport Club Internacional players
Tombense Futebol Clube players
Macaé Esporte Futebol Clube players
Grêmio Esportivo Anápolis players
Footballers from Rio de Janeiro (city)